India is scheduled to compete at the 2022 Asian Games in Hangzhou,  Zhejiang, China, from  23  September 2023 to 8 October 2023. However due to COVID-19 pandemic cases rising in China the event has been postponed and rescheduled.

Competitors

Archery 
After postponement of the Games India announced new squad for Asian Games as well as for Asian Championship on 21 February 2023.
Recurve
Individuals

Team Event

Compound 
Individuals 

Team Event

Athletics 
The Athletics Federation of India (AFI) has released a list of qualifying standards for Indian athletes looking to make the cut for the Asian Games 2022.
 
Men
Track Events*

Field Events*

Road Events*

 total 6 athletes qualified; other 2 will be considered as reserves.

 Women
 Track Events*

Field Events*

 Combined EventsEvents - Heptathlon*

 * Subject to Change

Badminton 
The Badminton Association of India (BAI) announced a 20-member squad for the Asian Games on 21 April.

Men

Women

Mixed

Boxing 
Five Women boxers have secured spots for upcoming Asian Games 2022.

Women

Bridge 
The Bridge Federation of India announced its team for the upcoming Asian Games in Hangzhou on 20 March 2023.
Team

Equestrian 
Amar Sarin, Pranay Khare, Yashaan Khambatta, Kahaani Setalvad and Zahan Setalvad have qualified in Show Jumping event.

While Deepanshu Sheoran has qualified in Eventing event. Ashish Limaye, Raju Singh Bhadoriya, Apoorva Dabade and Vikas Kumar qualified for Asian games after meeting criteria at event held in Bangalore.
Eventing

 Total five Indians qualified for Asian Games but an NOC can send maximum four athletes per event the other one will be considered as reserve 

Show jumping

Esports 
After qualification tournament held by Esports Federation of India, India will send athletes in FIFA Online 4 , Street Fighter V, Hearthstone , League of Legends. Later Hearthstone removed from official program.

Field Hockey 

India will send it's both men's and women's national hockey for upcoming Asian Games.

Summary

Men's tournament

Women's tournament

Golf 
Anirban Lahiri and Shubhankar Sharma in the men’s and Aditi Ashok and Tvesa Malik among the women were handed direct entries on the basis of their rankings. Viraj Madappa, Rashid Khan and Avani Prashanth qualified through trials held by the Indian Golf Union.

Men

 Women

Kabaddi 
India will send it's both men's and women's team for upcoming Asian Games.
Summary

Sailing 
Katya Coelho become Indian athlete to qualify in the event after she won gold medal in qualification tournament held at Mumbai.

Women

Softball 
India made its debut in Softball at Asian Games after given approval by Softball Asia.

See also 

 India at the 2018 Asian Games
 India at the 2022 Commonwealth Games

References

Nations at the 2022 Asian Games
2022
2023 in Indian sport